Eshun is a Ghanaian surname. Notable people with the surname include:

 Ekow Eshun (born 1968), British writer, journalist, and broadcaster
 Ethel Eshun (born 1994), Ghanaian singer
 John Eshun (born 1942), Ghanaian footballer
 Kodwo Eshun (born 1967), British-Ghanaian writer, theorist and film-maker
 Nana Eshun (born 1969), Ghanaian footballer
 Nana Eshun (footballer born 1982) (born 1982), Ghanaian footballer
 Robert Eshun (born 1974), Ghanaian footballer
 Nate A-Eshun (born 1991), Ghanaian musician